Susan "Dee" Haslam (née Bagwell, born July 5, 1954) is an American businesswoman. She is the founder and executive producer of RIVR Media and CEO of the Haslam Sports Group. Dee is a co-owner of the Cleveland Browns of the National Football League (NFL), along with her husband, Jimmy Haslam. The Haslams are also majority investors in the ownership group of the Columbus Crew of Major League Soccer (MLS) – highlighted by the MLS Cup 2020 winning team. She is also part of the family ownership group of the truck stop chain Pilot Flying J.

Early life and education
Haslam is the daughter of Ross Bagwell Sr. and Sue Burchfield Bagwell. Ross Bagwell is a pioneer in cable television, having produced thousands of hours of programming. He built one of the largest privately held production companies in the United States before selling to Scripps Howard in 1994.

Dee was raised on Long Island in her early years while her father attended NYU and worked for NBC. Upon returning to Knoxville, she completed her elementary school at Bearden Elementary and then middle school at Cedar Bluff. She attended Farragut High School for one year before transferring to Webb School of Knoxville, where she was a classmate with Jimmy Haslam.

Dee studied violin, was a girl scout, and participated in sports and clubs in high school. She and her brother, Ross, were very close growing up and later worked together in the family business. Ross Bagwell Jr. died in 2008.

After graduating from Webb, Haslam attended The University of Tennessee, graduating with a B.S. in Education. She also minored in art and still paints as a hobby.

In the spring of 1976, Dee and Jimmy began dating, and they married on December 11, 1976. They worked alongside each other in their respective family businesses throughout their careers. Partnering on finding store locations, business transactions, and major challenges. In 2012, they bought the Cleveland Browns and began their working together in earnest.

Career
At the age of 17, Haslam began working for her father at Bagwell Advertising, answering the phone. As her father began to grow the production company, Cinetel Productions, she also worked on the production projects. While at Bagwell Communications, she was an account executive. In 1994, when the company was sold to Scripps Howard, Dee left along with her father and brother to form a new company: Bagwell Entertainment/Ross Television Productions. In 1998, Dee and Rob Lundgren partnered to acquire Ross Television Productions and launch RIVR Media. Lori Stryer joined Dee and Rob as a partner a few years later. 
Together they have produced such hits as Trading Spaces for TLC, Whale Wars for Animal Planet, and Renovation Realities for HGTV and DIY Network, and Escaping Polygamy for A&E. Haslam is also senior executive for RIVR Digital and Nest Features.

Haslam is a member of The Academy of Television Art and Sciences, the International Women's Forum, C200, and the Society of International Business Fellows, She serves of the Executive board of directors of The United Way of Greater Cleveland, The Rock and Roll Hall of Fame, University Hospitals, the Greater Cleveland Partnership, the Greater Columbus Partnership, Emerald Youth Foundation, Lakeshore Park (active chair), the University of Tennessee Haslam College of Business Advisory Council and the State Collaborative on Reforming Education (SCORE) in Tennessee. In May 2017, she was appointed to the Board of ExcelinEd., President of the Cleveland Browns Foundation, the Unify Project and Cleveland Orchestra .

Sports ownership
On August 2, 2012, Dee, Jimmy and the Haslam family agreed to purchase the Cleveland Browns. The sale was unanimously approved by NFL owners on October 16, 2012, and the closing took place on October 25.

From 2014-15, the Cleveland Browns, in partnership with the City of Cleveland, completed a $125 million renovation project of FirstEnergy Stadium. The project included new videoboards, additional lower bowl seating and new and refurbished club and premium spaces, as well as new food and beverage selections throughout the venue.

Prior to the Cleveland Browns' 2016 season, the Haslams and the City of Berea agreed to invest nearly $15 million in the team's training facility. The development addressed various areas throughout the building, focusing primarily on team spaces for coaches and players, as well other aspects for the business side of the organization. Through the construction, the team renovated 25,000 square feet of space, added 25,000 square feet to the facility and redesigned the locker room, player meeting rooms, player lounge, cafeteria, training room and installed a lap pool and new hot and cold tubs. The renovation also included the addition of a 4,600 square-foot wellness center for Browns employee. The Browns and the City of Berea have also agreed to a lease extension to keep the Browns' headquarters in the city through at least 2039.

In May 2019, the NFL announced that the 2021 NFL Draft would be hosted in Cleveland. The Haslams and Browns partnered with the Greater Cleveland Sports Commission, City of Cleveland and Destination Cleveland on the bid to bring the event to Northeast Ohio.

As part of the NFL, Haslam serves on the Legislative Committee, Conduct Committee, and Social Justice Committee. She and Jimmy received the Tank Younger Award from the Fritz Pollard Alliance for having built one of the most diverse front offices in all of sports. Haslam was also awarded an honorary doctorate from Baldwin Wallace University in May 2017 after giving the school's commencement speech.

Haslam Sports Group received operating rights for Major League Soccer club Columbus Crew in January 2019. The Crew won the MLS Cup 2020, giving the Haslams their first major sports championship as owners. After acquiring those rights, Crew SC and Columbus officials announced the team would build a new Columbus Crew stadium in Confluence Village and the OhioHealth Performance Center, located at the current site of Historic Crew Stadium. Both venues opened in the summer of 2021.

Awards and honors
Sports ownership
MLS Cup 2020 champion (as co-owner of the Columbus Crew)

Television
Parents' Choice Award for Moving Picture Books
Genesis Award for Whale Wars

Charity work
Delta Delta Delta Community Volunteer Award
YWCA Tribute to Women Community Service Award

Business
Junior Achievement Business Award
New York Festivals World Medal 
University of Tennessee Distinguished Alumni Award 
Knoxville Chamber of Commerce Leadership Award and numerous ADDYs and Tellys.
Cleveland Crain's 2018 Women of Note

Personal life
Dee Haslam is married to Jimmy Haslam. The couple has three children, James Bagwell Haslam, Whitney Haslam Johnson and Cynthia Haslam Arnholt and 6 grandchildren.

They reside in Tennessee and Ohio.

References

Living people
1954 births
People from Knoxville, Tennessee
Businesspeople from Tennessee
American women television producers
University of Tennessee people
Columbus Crew
Television producers from Tennessee
21st-century American women
Women sports owners
Cleveland Browns owners